D41 may refer to:

 Akaflieg Darmstadt D-41, a German sailplane
 D41 road (Croatia)
 , a Perth-class destroyer of the Royal Australian Navy
 , a C-class light cruiser of the Royal Navy
 , a W-class destroyer of the Royal Navy
 Nissan Frontier (D41), a steam locomotive
 Nissan Frontier (D41), a pickup truck
 LNER Class D41, a class of British steam locomotives